The 1956–57 Durand Cup Final was the 53rd final of the Durand Cup, the oldest football competition in India, and was contested between Kolkata giant East Bengal and Hyderabad City Police on 5 January 1957 at the Delhi Gate Stadium in New Delhi.

East Bengal won the final 2–0 to claim their 3rd Durand Cup title. Balasubramanium and Musa Ghazi scored the goals for East Bengal in the final as East Bengal lifted their third Durand Cup title.

Route to the final

Match

Summary
The Durand Cup final began at the Delhi Gate Stadium in New Delhi on 5 January 1957 in front of a packed crowd as Kolkata giant East Bengal and faced Hyderabad City Police. East Bengal reached their third Durand Cup final after defeating the defending champions Madras Regimental Centre 2–0 in the semi-final, having own the tournament previously in 1951 and 1952. Hyderabad City Police made their fourth appearance in the final after they defeated E.M.E. Centre 2–1 in the semi-final, having previously won the cup in 1950 and 1954. 

East Bengal and Hyderabad City Police, both started the game positively, creating attacks but were denied by the strong defence from both the teams. In the nineteenth minute of the game, Anthony Patrick fouled Varahalu nead the box and Balasubramanium scored directly from the free-kick from 30 yards to give East Bengal the lead. Hyderabad tried to get back into the game but their forward line consisting of Sussay, Mohammed Zulfiqaruddin and Yousuf Khan wasted multiple chances. East Bengal doubled their lead in the second half with just seven minutes remaining when Musa Ghazi made a solo run past the defenders and scored for East Bengal to make it 2–0 as East Bengal held onto the scoreline and won their third Durand Cup title.

Details

References

External links
Durand Cup Finals

Durand Cup finals
1956–57 in Indian football
East Bengal Club matches
Football competitions in Kolkata